The post-9/11 period is the time after the September 11 attacks, characterized by heightened suspicion of non-Americans in the United States, increased government efforts to address terrorism, and a more aggressive American foreign policy.

Political consequences
 We also must never forget the most vivid events of recent history. On September the 11th, 2001, America felt its vulnerability – even to threats that gather on the other side of the earth. We resolved then, and we are resolved today, to confront every threat, from any source, that could bring sudden terror and suffering to America. – George W. Bush, 2002.
The attacks led to significant and widespread changes in U.S. politics and foreign policy. Domestically, both parties rallied around new or strengthened anti-terrorism legislation. Much of this legislation has been funded by western countries. Since 9/11 and as of 2011, there have been 119,044 anti-terror arrests and 35,117 convictions in 66 countries. By contrast, before 9/11 there were only a few hundred terrorism convictions each year.

In recent years, the war in Afghanistan, once viewed largely as a "just war", has lost popularity.  , more than 60% of Americans opposed the war.

During an interview for Frontline aired in 2021 former National Security Advisor Ben Rhodes, stated that Donald Trump was a true post 9/11 president and that "all the language, all the rhetoric, all the xenophobia, all the nationalism that is impossible without 9/11."

Department of Homeland Security

The United States government created the Department of Homeland Security (DHS) in response to the attacks. DHS is a cabinet-level department of the federal government of the United States charged with protecting the territory of the United States from terrorist attacks and responding to natural disasters.

With approximately 184,000 employees, DHS is the third-largest cabinet department in the U.S. federal government, after the Department of Defense and the Department of Veterans Affairs. Homeland security policy is coordinated at the White House by the Homeland Security Council. Other agencies with significant homeland security responsibilities include the Department of Health and Human Services, the Department of Justice, and the Department of Energy.

Societal consequences

Suspicion
In the U.S., many activities of foreigners or American citizens, which, prior to 9/11, would be viewed innocently (or as just eccentric), are now viewed with suspicion, especially in regards to the behavior of anyone who looks "Arab" in terms of clothing or skin color. Six Muslim imams were removed from a U.S. airliner when they prayed before the flight and showed "suspicious behavior". Various government agencies and police forces in the U.S. have asked people to watch people around them and report "unusual" behavior, and signs posted in all public places request citizens to report anything out of the ordinary. The United States Department of Homeland Security has advised citizens to "be vigilant, take notice of your surroundings, and report suspicious items or activities to local authorities immediately."

Discriminatory backlash
Since the attacks, Arab, Muslim, Sikh, and South-Asian Americans – as well as those perceived to be members of these groups – have been victims of threats, vandalism, arson, and murder in the United States.

Anti-Muslim bias has also shown up in politics, policy, and media.

In the years following the terrorist attacks on September 11, 2001, a cottage industry of misinformation experts devoted to spreading anti-Islam sentiment took root in the United States. The industry is made up of a tight-knit core of think tanks, pseudo-scholars, bloggers, and activists that are well-disciplined in their anti-Islamic messaging. These figures have gained in-roads with conservative media as well as in mainstream politics. Sometimes referred to as the “Counter-Jihad” movement, this social movement mainly exists to manufacture fear of Islam. This movement materialized post- September 11, 2001, in parallel with the United States government's “War on Terror,” invasions of Afghanistan and Iraq, and domestic surveillance programs. As author and scholar Khaled Beydoun writes in his book American Islamophobia, “The state has linked Muslims, whether immigrants or citizens, living in the United States or abroad, to the suspicion of terrorism, and has formally enacted a two-front war: the foreign war, and the surveillance, policing, and cultural wars deployed within the country.

While hate crimes and biased incidents against Muslims or those perceived to be Muslim increased in the post-September 11 era, the sophisticated network of anti-Muslim groups did not fully shape up until around Barack Obama became president. The movement's mass organizing arm came together in 2010 with the opposition to the Park51 Islamic center in New York City. In his book The Islamophobia Industry, author Nathan Lean writes, “The political and social climate of 2010 was ripe for expressions of hate. Nine years after September 11, 2001, a time when many would have expected anti-Muslim sentiment to be in decline. In fact, it was higher than the days and weeks following that horrible fall tragedy."

In 2010, a proposed Islamic center in New York City's Lower Manhattan became a flashpoint of Islamophobia in the United States. The effort was largely led by Robert Spencer and Pamela Geller, two anti-Muslim bloggers who would go on to form the Stop the Islamization of America group. The two came out in opposition to the proposed Park51 Islamic center, or the “Ground Zero Mosque” as it later be dubbed  given its proximity  to the fallen World Trade Center Towers. Geller claimed the mosque would be viewed by Muslims worldwide as a “triumphal monument” built on “conquered land.” Others political figures joined in on spreading conspiracy theories about Park51. Former American vice presidential candidate Sarah Palin called it  “an intolerable mistake on hallowed ground.” Former House Speaker Newt Gingrich lamented it as “an act of triumphalism.”

Geller and Spencer staged a protest against the mosque in 2010, which drew crowds both in support and opposition to the proposed Islamic center. In 2011, Spencer and Geller co-produced a film entitled, “The Ground Zero Mosque: Second Wave of the 9/11 Attacks.” This would be the first of several high-profile mosque opposition campaigns, with another taking place in that same year in Murfreesboro, Tennessee.

Organized Islamophobia has since grown in the since after the September 11 attacks. The Southern Poverty Law Center reported a 197 percent increase in anti-Muslim hate groups between 2015 and 2016, rising from 34 to 101 active groups. The number has remained high since, with SPLC documenting 72 anti-Muslim hate groups in 2020. These groups continued to gain in-roads in media and politics.

Media outlets like Fox News have provided space to Islamophobic figures like Brigitte Gabriel, Robert Spencer, and Frank Gaffney. These figures are repeatedly invited on Fox to discuss Islam, terrorism, and national security, despite their biased agenda. Media outlets like CNN (source) and MSNBC have also been accused of fomenting Islamophobia.

Spreading Islamophobia proved to be politically expedient in the post-September 11 era. Islamophobic group members have gained political allies at the federal and state level. Sen. Ted Cruz has appeared at events put on the anti-Muslim think tank Center for Security Policy. Cruz tapped Center for Security Policy founder Frank Gaffney to serve on his foreign policy advisory during his 2016 presidential run.

Republican Reps. Scott Perry, Brian Babin, and eight other federal lawmakers attended ACT for America's national conference in Washington, D.C. The SPLC has designated ACT for America as an anti-Muslim hate group. Former Washington State Rep. Matt Shea received an award from ACT in 2015. “I have proudly served my country, fighting against terrorism during combat tours in Bosnia and Iraq, but 9/11 taught us a hard lesson that we must be ever vigilant here in our homeland. We must always be prepared and ACT in defense of our country, the Constitution, and freedom," Shea said after receiving the award.

Politics appears to be one of the main drivers of Islamophobia. A 2018 report from New America found that bigoted election campaigns were more likely to drive anti-Muslim activity rather than terrorist attacks. “Looking at the statistics, it is clear that the rise in these incidents are tied to the election cycle,” said Robert McKenzie, a senior fellow at New America, told The Intercept. “If spikes in anti-Muslim activity only occurred due to terrorism, we would expect to see more incidents following high-profile attacks like the Boston Marathon bombing and Charlie Hebdo, but we didn't. What we do have are folks running for elected office who are using megaphones to talk about how dangerous Muslims are.”

A 2019 poll conducted the Institute for Social Policy and Understanding found that politics is more likely to drive Islamophobia versus one's faith. The poll also found that those who espouse beliefs Islamophobic are more likely to intolerant toward Jewish people or LGBT individuals. And as author and scholar Deepa Kumar observes, “In the political sphere, particularly during an election year, Islamophobia serves to garner political support for candidates, which they hope to translate into votes. While Donald Trump is the most egregious and visible voice of anti-Muslim racism in this group, the phenomenon is far bigger than Trump. As I have argued elsewhere, this is a bipartisan project. The endless war on terror that has consumed trillions of dollars could not be sustained without the fear of a Muslim terrorist enemy.”

Peddling Islamophobic rhetoric in the post-September 11 world has become a lucrative job with millions of dollars sloshing around the movement. A 2013 report from the Center for American Progress found $42.6 million to Islamophobia think tanks between 2001 and 2009. A 2019 report from the Council on American-Islamic Relations found $125 million has been funneled to Islamophobic groups through foundations and donor-advised funds between 2014 and 2016.

Safety concerns
Due to many Americans having the fear of flying, auto usage increased after the attacks. This resulted in an estimated 1,595 additional highway deaths in the ensuing year. This fear of flying also created the Transportation Security Administration (TSA), which is used to increase safety and reduce fear of flying in citizens.

Censorship

Films and television programs produced before 2001 that feature the Twin Towers of the World Trade Center or events similar to 9/11 have been edited in re-airings on television. One such example is an episode of The Simpsons, "The City of New York vs. Homer Simpson," the main setting of which is the World Trade Center.

After 9/11, Clear Channel Communications (an owner of over 1,000 radio stations in the U.S.) released a list of songs deemed "inappropriate". The songs were not banned outright, but stations were advised not to play them.

The New York-based band Dream Theater released a live album titled Live Scenes from New York on September 11, 2001. The cover art depicted the Manhattan skyline, including the World Trade Center towers in flames. It was immediately recalled, and the artwork altered.

Another New York-based band, The Strokes, originally had "New York City Cops" as the ninth track on their 2001 breakthrough debut album Is This It. The album, initially released in June of that year in Australia, was released stateside on October 9, with "New York City Cops" removed and replaced with the newer "When It Started" as a result of the attacks.

In an act of self-censorship, American rock band Jimmy Eat World changed the title of their third album, Bleed American, to a self-titled album, after the attacks.

British band Bush were forced to change the name of their single 'Speed Kills' to The People That We Love. They also changed the original artwork for their album Golden State before it was released which originally depicted a picture of a plane in mid-air.

The music video for a song called 'Piece By Piece' by British band Feeder was also changed. The original video depicted animated characters of the band playing in a New York skyscraper with the World Trade Center in the background and planes flying near by. The band later jump from the window of the building.

When Sean Altman recorded "Zombie Jamboree" for The GrooveBarbers album Guts, he changed the lyrics to, "There's an acapella zombie singing down Broadway" instead of the line that he and Rockapella had sung for years, "There's a high-wire zombie between the World Trades".

See also
List of unsuccessful terrorist plots in the United States post-9/11
Abdallah Higazy

References

Aftermath of the September 11 attacks
Historical eras
Consequences of events